Jonathon Ross may refer to:

 Jonathon Ross (water polo) (born 1987), water polo player from New Zealand
 Jonathon Ross (footballer) (born 1973), Australian rules footballer

See also
 Jonathan Ross (born 1960), English television and radio personality
 Jonathan Ross (disambiguation)